Siseebakwet Lake is a lake in Itasca County, in the U.S. state of Minnesota.

Siseebakwet is a name derived from the Ojibwe language meaning "sugar".

See also
List of lakes in Minnesota

References

Lakes of Minnesota
Lakes of Itasca County, Minnesota